Nuncius: Journal of the Material and Visual History of Science (formerly the Annali dell'Istituto e Museo di storia della scienza di Firenze) is a triannual peer-reviewed academic journal covering the history of science, especially the "historical role of material and visual culture in science". The journal was established in 1976 by Maria Luisa Righini Bonelli as the Annali dell'Istituto e Museo di storia della scienza di Firenze. The journal changed its publisher in 2011. It is published by Brill Publishers and the editor-in-chief is Elena Canadelli of the University of Padua, Italy.

Abstracting and indexing
The journal is abstracted and indexed in:

According to the Journal Citation Reports, the journal has a 2020 impact factor of 0,325.

See also
 Sidereus Nuncius

References

External links
 

Publications established in 1976
History of science journals
English-language journals
Triannual journals
Brill Publishers academic journals